The Kiewa-Sandy Creek Football Club, nicknamed the Hawks, is an Australian rules football club playing in the Tallangatta & District Football League. The club is based in the Victorian towns of Kiewa, Sandy Creek and Tangambalanga.

History
Sandy Creek Football Club
1898–1906: Local games
1907: Mitta Mitta Football League
1908: Tallangatta & District Football League
Kiewa Football Club
1908: Tallangatta & District Football League
Dreadnought Football Club (Sandy Creek Football Club and Kiewa Football Club merged)
1909: Twomey-Steward Football League
1910–1913: Club in recess
Sandy Creek Football Club (reformed)
1914: Wodonga & District Football League
1915–1919: Club in recess
1920: Kiewa & District Football League
1921–1931: Club in recess
1932: Yackandandah Football League
1933–1934: Tallangatta & District Football League
1935–1938: Club in recess
1939: Dederang & District Football League
1940: Kiewa & Mitta Valleys Football League
1941–1944: Club in recess
1945–1946: Tallangatta & District Football League
1947–1949: Yackandandah Football League
1950–1968: Tallangatta & District Football League
Kiewa Football Club (reformed)
1914–1919: Club in recess
1920–1921: Kiewa & District Football League
1922–1923: Tallangatta & District Football League
1924–1931: Club in recess
1932: Yackandandah Football League
1933: Tallangatta & District Football League
1934–1939: Club in recess
1940: Kiewa & Mitta Valleys Football League
1941–1945: Club in recess
1946–1951: Yackandandah Football League
1952–1968: Tallangatta & District Football League
Kiewa-Sandy Creek Football Club (Sandy Creek Football Club and Kiewa Football Club merged)
1969–present: Tallangatta & District Football League

Premierships
 Yackandandah Football League (3): 1947, 1948, 1949
 Tallangatta & District Football League (16): 1908, 1923, 1934, 1969, 1970, 1972, 1976, 1977, 1981, 1983, 1984, 1995, 2008, 2011, 2014, 2018

References

External links
 Gameday website 

Australian rules football clubs in Victoria (Australia)
1969 establishments in Australia